, born , was the pen-name of a Japanese author, tanka poet, and Buddhist scholar active during the Taishō and early Shōwa periods of Japan.

Early life
Kanoko's maiden name was Ōnuki Kano. She was born in Aoyama, Akasaka-ku (present day Minato, Tokyo), to an extremely wealthy family. Her father suffered from lung disease, and Kanoko was sent to the Ohnuki family estate in Futako Tamagawa, Kawasaki, Kanagawa, where she was raised by a governess.

Literary career
Okamoto was influenced greatly by her older brother, Shosen, and his classmate Jun'ichirō Tanizaki who studied at the First Higher School and Tokyo Imperial University. While still a student at the Atami Gakuen girls' high school, Kanoko called on the poet, Yosano Akiko, and this encounter prompted her to start contributing  to the poetry magazine  ("Bright Star"). Along with Yosano, she joined Hiratsuka Raichō, Tamura Toshiko, and others, to be one of the initial contributors to the influential Bluestocking journal, helping to set the course for women writers and feminist ideas, in 1911. Later, she played an active part as a key contributor to another journal,  ("Pleiades"). She published , the first of her five  anthologies, in 1912.

In 1908, she met cartoonist Okamoto Ippei while on a holiday in Karuizawa, Nagano, together with her father. However, her family was extremely opposed to the relationship, and she created a scandal by moving in together with him in 1910 without marrying. Their eldest son, the avant-garde painter Tarō Okamoto, was born the next year. However, Kanoko's family life was filled with tragedy. Soon after she moved in with Ippei, her brother and then her mother died. Her eldest daughter was born with mental health problems, and soon died. Her common-law husband was opposed to her independence, jealous of her artistic successes and was unfaithful. Her younger son was also born with weak health, and died in infancy.

These problems led Okamoto to turn to religion. She was first interested in Protestant Christianity, but did not find it to her liking. She then turned to the Jodo Shinshu sect of Buddhism, as expounded by Shinran, which was the start of her work as a researcher of Buddhism, about which she wrote numerous essays.

After releasing her fourth tanka anthology  ("My Last Anthology") in 1929, she decided to become a novelist. She took her whole family to Europe to complete her literary studies. They traveled to Paris, London, Berlin, and (leaving their son behind) toured around the United States, returning to Japan in 1932.

After returning home, Okamoto continued her researches into Buddhism, but also found time to a novelette called  ("The Dying Crane"), describing the last days of writer Ryūnosuke Akutagawa, while staying at an inn near Kamakura Station in the summer of 1923. Published in the magazine  in 1936, it marked the start of her activity with prose fiction.

A recurring theme in her work is the effect of a person's familial ancestral karma on their present-day lives. While praised for the richness of her use of language, some critics have felt that she tended towards excessive passion and unnecessary literary flourishes.

She died of a brain hemorrhage in 1939. She was 49 years old. Her grave is at the Tama Cemetery in Fuchu, Tokyo.

Because she did not begin writing actively until her later years, most of her works were published posthumously.

Selected works
  (The Dying Crane) (1936)
  (A Midsummer Night's Dream) (1937)
  (The Relationship between Mother and Child) (1937)
  (A Riot of Goldfish) (1937)
  (Portrait of an Old Geisha) (1938)
  (Stream of Light) (1938)
  (Story of Inside the Grass Circle) (1939)
  (Lively Ebb and Flow) (1940)
  (The Opening of the Female Body) (1943)

English translations
 A Riot of Goldfish. Translated by J. Keith Vincent. London, Hesperus Press (2010). (Also includes "The Food Demon" [])

See also
 Japanese literature
 List of Japanese authors

References

Sugisaki, Kazuko. 'A Writer's Life: A Biographical Sketch'. In The House Spirit by Okamoto, Kanoko translated by Sugisaki, Kazuko. Capra Press (1995). 
Copeland, Rebecca. The Modern Murasaki: Writing by Women of Meiji Japan. Columbia University Press (2007).

External links 
Kamakura's Literary Figures
e-texts of works on Aozora Bunko 
 
 

1889 births
1939 deaths
Writers from Tokyo
Japanese women novelists
Japanese women poets
20th-century Japanese poets
20th-century Japanese novelists
20th-century Japanese women writers
Pseudonymous women writers
20th-century pseudonymous writers